Jägerschnitzel (German for 'hunter's cutlet', in French ) is a German dish made of a roast veal or pork cutlet with a sauce made of mushrooms and tomatoes or cream. In regional cuisine the dish can also be a schnitzel made of breaded, roasted jagdwurst with tomato sauce and Spätzle noodles.

Classic preparation
To prepare jägerschnitzel in the classic way, an unbreaded veal cutlet is first roasted in butter. The sauce is made of shallots soaked in white wine and cooked in a tomato sauce, and mixed with sliced champignons, chanterelles and morels. A variation of the dish is a shortly roasted pork cutlet in sour cream topped with fried onions, chanterelles and bell pepper.

A common variety of jägerschnitzel consists of a breaded pork cutlet with a dark mushroom cream sauce. It is usually served with french fries, noodles or rice.

Jägerschnitzel from jagdwurst

To prepare jägerschnitzel from jagdwurst, the sausage is first cut into finger-thick slices, breaded with bread roll crumbs and roasted in cooking oil or clarified butter until crispy and topped with tomato sauce. It is usually served with noodles, potatoes (mashed potato, french fries or potato salad), or served alone as a snack. A common variety in the German Democratic Republic was served with vegetables and lecsó. The dish was popular in the GDR, particularly served in volume at canteens or as a school meal.

Bibliography
 Herbert Frauenberger: Ostdeutsche Gerichte mit Geschichte(n), Second edition. BuchVerlag für die Frau, Leipzig 2017, p. 64.

External links
 
 Jägerschnitzel at Wikibooks

German cuisine
Veal dishes
Pork dishes
Sausage dishes
East German culture